Ortygia is a small island which is the historical centre of the city of Syracuse, Sicily. The name originates from the Ancient Greek , which means "quail".

Overview

The Homeric Hymn to Delian Apollo has it that the goddess Leto stopped at Ortygia to give birth to Artemis, the firstborn of her twins. Artemis then helped Leto across the sea to the island of Delos, where Leto gave birth to Apollo. Other ancient sources state that the twins were born in the same place – which was either Delos or Ortygia – but Ortygia, according to Strabo was an old name of Delos. Further, there were perhaps a half-dozen other places called Ortygia, so that the identification is uncertain.

It was also said that Asteria, the sister of Leto, metamorphosed into a quail (Ortyx), threw herself into the sea, and was metamorphosed into the island of Ortygia. Another myth suggested that it was Delos, rather than Ortygia.

Eos, the goddess of the dawn, fell in love with the mortal hunter Orion and abducted him to Ortygia, where he met Artemis and joined her retinue. He was slain by the goddess either for because the gods did not approve of goddesses taking mortal men to lovers, or for challenging her in an archery contest, or trying to force himself upon one of her maids.

Ortygia was the mythological home of Arethusa, a chaste nymph who, while fleeing a river god, was transformed by Artemis into a spring, traversed underground and appeared here, thus providing water for the city. Arethusa and her pursuer, the river god Alpheus, came from Arcadia in Greece.

History

Ortygia, being an island just off the coast, was easily transformed into a natural fortress with harbors and was big enough that it could hold a significant population in ancient times.  Therefore, the history of Ortygia is synonymous with the early history of Syracuse.

Location

Ortygia is located at the eastern end of Syracuse and is separated from it by a narrow channel.  Two bridges connect the island to mainland Sicily.  The island is a popular location for tourists, shopping, entertainment and is also a residential area.

Subdistricts
Graziella 
Bottari
Mastrarua
Spirduta
Maestranza
Duomo
Giudecca
Turba
Castello Maniace

Landmarks
Cathedral of Syracuse
Piazza del Duomo, Syracuse
Piazza Archimede
Fountain of Arethusa

See also
Two Brothers Rocks

References

External links

 Levinson Travel Guides 
 Google Satellite Imagery
 Ortigia Island Website
 Ortigia Island Photos
 Official Fan Page

Locations in Greek mythology
Ancient Syracuse
Islands of Sicily
Syracuse, Sicily
Leto

he:סירקוזה#אורטיג'יה